The blackedge moray eel (Gymnothorax nigromarginatus) is a moray eel found in coral reefs in the western Atlantic Ocean. It was first named by Charles Frédéric Girard in 1858.

References

nigromarginatus
Fish described in 1858